The Magic Brush is a Chinese animated stop-motion film produced by the Shanghai Animation Film Studio.  There were two versions of the film.  In 1954 the first film was called "Ma Liang and his Magic Brush" (Chinese: 神筆馬良).  In 1955 the second film was called "Magic Brush" (Chinese: 神筆).  They are also interchangeably referred to as the "Magic Pen" or "Magical Pen".

Plot

A young and kind peasant boy named Ma Liang used to cut reeds and bamboo from the rich . He liked drawing and drew pictures everywhere and had the greatest dream to be an artist.

As Ma Liang gets ready for bed one night after looking at all his drawings, an elderly man appeared in his dream and gave him a paintbrush. He informs Ma Liang of the brush's great power and tells him to use it wisely. Before Ma Liang can thank him, the old man disappeared . To test the power, Ma Liang uses the brush to paint a rooster. When he paints the last feather, the rooster comes to life and flies off. Realizing the power of the brush, Ma Liang vows to use it to help others and remembers the words of the old man.

From that day on, Ma Liang used the paintbrush to help others with their needs or troubles . Ma Liang later paints rice and fish which came to life .

Many people knew about the magic paintbrush, one of which was a powerful man, the emperor , who pays a visit to Ma Liang and invites him to his home. Unknown to Ma Liang, the emperor was a selfish and arrogant bad man who had an idea to steal the paintbrush and make a lot of money by turning things to life and keeping them. When Ma Liang refuses to heed the emperor 's commands to paint a peacock for him due to his promise to the magician to use he brush wisely, he is imprisoned in a dungeon. 
 
He took away his brush and invited a lot of his friends to come to his home and shows them the magic paintbrush. He drew a lot of pictures, of which none became real.

Realizing in anger that the pictures would become real when Ma Liang paints, the emperor orders his men to send for Ma Liang. He offers Ma Liang his freedom if he paints a mountain of gold. Discovering the emperor's deception, Ma Liang devises a plan to trick the greedy emperor and agrees by telling the emperor to have patience and obey his words. He paints a sea much to the emperor's dismay but Ma Liang assures him that he is trying to make his work impressive. After the boy paints a golden mountain in the distance, the emperor was angry and asks him to paint a ship for him and his men to gather the gold.

The emperor and his men hurry aboard the ship. When they are at the middle of the sea, the emperor tells Ma Liang to give him wind to increase the ship's speed. Ma Liang paints a wind cloud and then continues to paint storm clouds. A horrified emperor calls out to Ma Liang to ease the weather saying that he and his men and friends would die. But Ma Liang defies orders and continued to paint more storm clouds. Giant waves crash against the ship and the vessel breaks then sinks, drowning the emperor and his friends.

Ma Liang goes back to his simple life and lives happily with his family. He always becomes ready to help everyone in need. Although he continues to do more artworks, he occasionally uses his magic paintbrush. Not a single person dared Ma Liang to use his magic brush for evil purposes and greedy wishes. So the magic paintbrush was known by everyone.

Adaptations
The story has been readapted a number of times by Chinese authors, common versions include the story of the same name from author Han Xing as well as Hong Xuntao. The American adaptation titled as "Tye May and the Magic Brush" by Molly Bang features a female protagonist as the title character.
 The Magic Paintbrush, written by Liz Miles, illustrated by Meilo So (Oxford University Press, 2011).
 The Magic Paintbrush, written by Jillian Powell (Wayland, 2011).
 The Magic Paintbrush, written by Julia Donaldson, illustrated by Joel Stewart (Igloo, Macmillan, 2004).
 The Magic Paintbrush, written by Laurence Yep, illustrated by Suling Wang (Harper Collins, 2000).
 The Magic Paintbrush, written by Robin Muller (Doubleday Canada, 1989).
 Tye May and the Magic Brush, by Molly Bang (HarperCollins, 1980).
 The Magic Paintbrush, adapted by Fran Hunia from the traditional tale, illustrated by Martin Aitchison (Ladybird Books, 1970s)
 Ma Lien and the Magic Brush, written by Hisako Kimishima, illustrated by Kei Wakana (Parents' Magazine Press, 1968)

Awards
 Won the outstanding film award in the 1957 Poland Warsaw International Film Festival children's competition.
 Won the children's entertainment films award at the Venice, Italy 8th International Children's Film Festival
 Won the silver award at the Damascus, Syrian 1st International Film Festival Expo
 Won the outstanding children's film award at the Belgrade Yugoslavia 1st International Children's Film Festival
 Recognized at the Canada 2nd Stratford International Film Festival awards
 In 1955 awarded for outstanding film by China's Ministry of Culture.

Creators

See also
 List of stop-motion films

References

External links
 The 1954 film at China's Movie Database
 The 1955 film at China's Movie Database

Ma Liang and his Magic Brush
1955 films
Chinese animated short films
Chinese animated films
1950s stop-motion animated films
Mandarin-language films
1954 animated films
1955 animated films
1954 short films
1955 short films